The 2008-09 Biathlon World Cup/World Cup 5 was scheduled to be held in Ruhpolding, Germany. From Wednesday January 14 until Sunday January 18, 2009.

Schedule of events
The provisional schedule of the event is below.

Medal winners

Men

Women

References

Biathlon World Cup - World Cup 5, 2008-09
Biathlon competitions in Germany
Sports competitions in Bavaria
2000s in Bavaria
January 2009 sports events in Europe
2009 in German sport